Rishi Kumaar (1975–2018) was a Singaporean actor, musician, lyricist, known for acting in the  Vasantham drama Vettai. He was the second runner-up of Vasantham Star 2005 (Singapore Indian Idol Competition) organized by MediaCorp Vasantham.

Kumaar was a graduate from the Asian Academy Of Film & Television in Delhi. He was also well known for famous songs that were featured in "Vettai", "Planet Galatta" and many more.

Awards
2004 - Nominee for "Best Original Composition" for I'm in love at Pradhana Vizhla 2004 (MediaCorp TV12)
2005 - 2nd runner-up for Vasantham Star (MediaCorp TV12)

References

1975 births
Living people
21st-century Singaporean male singers
20th-century Singaporean male singers